Marham is a village and civil parish in the English county of Norfolk, approximate  away from King's Lynn. An RAF station, RAF Marham, is situated  nearby at Upper Marham.

The villages name means 'Pool homestead/village' or 'hemmed-in land with a pool'.

Governance
Marham is a parish of the Kings Lynn and West Norfolk district council, which is responsible for the most local services. Norfolk County Council is in charge of roads, some schools, and social services, and the county councillor for the Gayton & Nar Valley division is Graham Middleton (Conservative) since 2017. For Westminster elections Marham forms part of the South West Norfolk constituency, represented by Liz Truss (Conservative).

Religion
Holy Trinity Church of England parish church is a Grade I listed building. It dates from Norman times and has a Norman doorway. Since its original design, each part of the building has been reconstructed. The doorway has a single-scallop shaft on each side. The semi-circular arch is high enough to allow the tympanum within to be filled with a checkered "lozenge" pattern.

Marham Methodist church joins with the Anglicans for some of its services.

Notes 

http://kepn.nottingham.ac.uk/map/place/Norfolk/Marham

External links

Information from Genuki Norfolk on Marham.

Villages in Norfolk
King's Lynn and West Norfolk
Civil parishes in Norfolk